The Millet Lagarde ML-10 was a French experimental single-engine light aircraft of the late 1940s. This strange biplane model, which first flew on 28 October 1949, was designed as the first of two examples.

Development

The Millet Lagarde ML-10 was a one-off prototype of an experimental four-seat biplane.  The upper wing was fixed to the cabin roof and the lower wing was fixed to the bottom of the cabin. The wings were heavily staggered so that the upper wing's trailing edge and lower wing's leading edge were vertically in line with each other.

The Regnier  R6B engine was fitted at the rear of the cabin in pusher layout.  Twin booms supported the twin fins and a medium/high-set tailplane. The aircraft was fitted with a tricycle undercarriage.

The first prototype, F-WEPK, was completed in 1949 and by 1957 was in storage at Pontoise/Cormeilles-en-Vexin airfield to the west of Paris. A second aircraft, with some modifications, was built by SCAM (Société des Constructions Aéronautiques du Maine) and designated SCAM C.50 Milane II, registered as F-WEAI. No example of this unusual aircraft design survives in existence.

Specifications

References

1940s French civil utility aircraft
Biplanes
Single-engined pusher aircraft
Twin-boom aircraft
Aircraft first flown in 1949